Roman or Romans most often refers to:
Rome, the capital city of Italy 
Ancient Rome, Roman civilization from 8th century BC to 5th century AD
Roman people, the people of ancient Rome
Epistle to the Romans, shortened to Romans, a letter in the New Testament of the Christian Bible

Roman or Romans may also refer to:

Arts and entertainment

Music
Romans (band), a Japanese pop group
Roman (album), by Sound Horizon, 2006
Roman (EP), by Teen Top, 2011
"Roman (My Dear Boy)", a 2004 single by Morning Musume

Film and television
Film Roman, an American animation studio
Roman (film), a 2006 American suspense-horror film
Romans (2013 film), an Indian Malayalam comedy film
Romans (2017 film), a British drama film
The Romans (Doctor Who), a serial in British TV series

People
Roman (given name), a given name, including a list of people and fictional characters
Roman (surname), including a list of people named Roman or Romans
Ῥωμαῖοι (Romans), the name of the Greeks in the Middle Ages and during Ottoman rule
Rûm, a generic term used at different times in the Muslim world with various meanings
Romance peoples, a term referring to speakers of Romance languages

Places

Roman
Roman, Bulgaria
Roman Municipality
Roman, Eure, France
Roman, Romania
Roman County, a historic county 
Roman, Sakha Republic, Russia
Roman River, Essex, England
Roman Valley, Nova Scotia, Canada

Romans
Romans, Ain, France
Romans, Deux-Sèvres, France
Romans d'Isonzo, Italy
Romans-sur-Isère, France

Religion
Roman Catholic, the largest Christian church
Roman Catholic (term)

Other uses
Nancy Grace Roman Space Telescope, also known as the Roman Space Telescope, a NASA initiative
Roman (company), now Ro, a digital health company
Roman (vehicle manufacturer), or ROMAN, a Romanian truck manufacturer
Roman script or Latin script, graphic signs based on letters of the classical Latin alphabet
Roman numerals, numbers from Ancient Rome
Roman type, one of the three main kinds of historical type

See also

 
 

History of Rome (disambiguation)
Roman language (disambiguation)
Rome (disambiguation)
Greco-Roman world
Romani people or Romany, colloquially known as Gypsies or Roma